

Recipients

The following is the list of Award-winning films for the Karnataka State Best Family Entertainer award.

See also
 Karnataka State Film Awards

References

Karnataka State Film Awards
2011 establishments in Karnataka